The islands of the Philippines, also known as the Philippine Archipelago, comprises about 7,641 islands, of which only about 2,000 are inhabited. More than 5,000 islands of the archipelago are yet to be given official names.

They are clustered into the three major island groups of Luzon, Visayas, and Mindanao.

List of islands by size
Below is a list of the largest Philippine islands. There are discrepancies in the area estimates across various sources, which would change the rankings of some smaller islands. The areas given may not be definitive.

A.  Rankings only provided for the first 40 largest islands. The list is incomplete, missing some islands with unknown or unreliable areas, making the rankings for smaller islands uncertain.

The following list breaks the islands down further by region and smaller island group for easier reference.

Luzon

Babuyan Group of Islands

 Babuyan Island
 Balintang Islands
 Barit Island
 Calayan Island
 Camiguin Island
 Dalupiri Island
 Didicas Island
 Fuga Island
 Iroo Island
 Maybag Island
 Pamoctan Island
 Pan de Azucar Island
 Panuitan Island
 Pinon Island

Bacuit Group of Islands

 Bury Island
 Cadlao Island
 Calitang Island
 Camago Island
 Cavayan Island
 Caverna Island
 Commando Island
 Depeldet Island
 Diapila Island
 Dibuluan Island
 Dilumacad Island
 Dolarog Island
 Emmit Island
 Entalula Island
 Guintungauan Island
 Inambuyod Island
 Lagen Island
 Lalutaya Island
 Malapacao Island
 Matinloc Island
 Miniloc Island
 Mitre Island
 Nacpan Island
 North Guntao Island
 Paglugaban Island
 Pangalusian Island
 Peaked Island
 Pinagbuyatan Island
 Pinasil Island
 Saddle Island
 Shimizu Island
 South Guntao Island
 Tapiutan Island
 Tent Islands
 Vigan Island

Batanes Group of Islands

 Batan Island
 Dequey Island
 Diogo Island
 Itbayat Island
 Ivuhos Island
 Mavudis Island
 Sabtang Island
 Siayan Island

Bicol Region

 Anahau Island
 Anchor Island
 Animasola Island
 Apuao Grande Island
 Apuao Island
 Atulayan Island
 Bagacay Island
 Bagatao Island
 Bagieng Island
 Balagbag Islands
 Bani Island
 Basot Island
 Batan Island (Albay)
 Batan Island (Sorsogon)
 Buguias Island
 Butauanan Island
 Cagbalisay Island
 Cabgan Island
 Cagbinunga Island
 Cagbulauan Island
 Cagraray Island
 Calabagio Island
 Calaguas Islands
 Calalanag Island
 Calambayanga Island
 Calintaan Island
 Canimo Island
 Canton Island
 Capugdan Island
 Caringo Island
 Catanduanes Island
 Cauit Island
 Cimarron Islets
 Cotivas Island
 Daruanac Island
 Dehanlo Island
 Entrance Island
 Etinas Island
 Gota Island
 Guihinyan Island
 Guinabugan Island
 Guinanayan Island
 Guintinua Island
 Haponan Island
 Huag Island
 Hunongan Island
 Ingalan Island
 Juag Island
 Laja Island
 Lahos Island
 Lahuy Island
 Lamit Islands
 Lato Islet
 Maculabo Island
 Mahadi Island
 Malarad Islands
 Malasugue Island
 Malaumauan Island
 Manito Island
 Masnou Island
 Matanga Island
 Matukad Island
 Minalahos Island
 Monteverde Island
 Ocata Island
 Pagbocayan Island
 Paguriran Island
 Palompon Islands
 Palita Island
 Palumbato Island
 Panay Island
 Parayan Island
 Pimacuapan Islands
 Pinaglukaban Island
 Pitogo Island
 Porongpong Island
 Puling Island
 Quinalasag Islands
 Quinamanuca Island
 Quinapagyan Island
 Rapu-rapu Island
 Refugio Island
 Rosa Islet
 Sabitang Laya Island
 Saboon Island
 Samur Island
 San Miguel Island (Albay)
 San Miguel Island (Camarines Sur)
 Siapa Island
 Sibauan Island
 Siruma Island
 Sombrero Island
 Subic Island
 Sula Island
 Tabusao Island
 Tag Island
 Tailon Island
 Tanao Islands
 Tanglar Island
 Ticlin Island
 Tignob Island
 Tinaga Island
 Tinago Island

Cagayan Valley
 

 Apulagan Island
 Ati Island
 Catali Island
 Cent Island
 Dipodo Island
 Disumangit Island
 Escucha Island
 Estagno Island
 Dos Hermanos Islands (Cagayan)
 Gay Island
 Gran Laja Island
 Lafu Island
 Maloncon Island
 Manidad Island
 Masalansan Island
 Palaui Island
 Rona Island
 San Vicente Island
 Sibato Island
 Sinago Island
 Spires Island

Calamianes Islands

 Alava Island
 Apo Island
 Ariara Island
 Bacbac Island
 Bakbak Island
 Bantac Island
 Barselisa Island
 Bayaca Island
 Binalabag Island
 Black Island
 Bolinah Island
 Bugur Island
 Bulalacao Island
 Bunaun Island
 Busuanga Island
 Cabilauan Island
 Cabulauan Island
 Cacayatan Island
 Cagbatan Island
 Cagdanao Island
 Calanhayaun Island
 Calauit Island
 Calibang Island
 Calipipit Island
 Calumbagan Island
 Camanga Island
 Canaron Island
 Canipo Island
 Cheron Island
 Chindonan Island
 Compare Island
 Condut Island
 Coron Island
 Culion Island
 Debogso Island
 Delian Island
 Demelias Island
 Depagal Island
 Dibanca Islands
 Dibatoc Island
 Diboyoyan Island
 Dibutonay Island
 Dicabaito Island
 Dicalubuan Island
 Dicapadiac Island
 Dicapululan Island
 Dicoyan Island
 Dimakya Island
 Dimancal Island
 Dimanglet Island
 Dimansig Island
 Dimipac Island
 Dinanglet Island
 Dinaran Island
 Dipalian Island
 Ditaytayan Island
 Diwaran Island
 Dumunpalit Island
 East Malcatop Island
 East Nalaut Island
 Elet Island
 Galoc Island
 Gintu Island
 Gued Island
 Guinlep Island
 Guintungauan Island
 Hadyibulao Island
 Hidong Island
 Horse Island
 Ile Island
 Inapupan Island
 Kalampisauan Island
 Lagat Island
 Lajo Island
 Lamud Island
 Lanit Island
 Lauauan Island
 Liatui Island
 Linapacan Island
 Lubutglubut Island
 Lusong Island
 Maapdit Island
 Magranting Island
 Malajon Island
 Malaposo Island
 Malaroyroy Island
 Malbatan Island
 Malcapuya Island
 Malcatop Island
 Malpagalen Island
 Maltatayoc Island
 Malubutglubut Island
 Manglet Island
 Manlegad Island
 Manolaba Island
 Manolebeng Island
 Marily Island
 Mayokok Island
 Mininlay Island
 Naglayan Island
 Nanga Island
 Nanga Island
 Nangalao Island
 Napula Island
 Napuscud Island
 Nici Island
 North Cay Island
 North Malbinchilao Island
 Octon Island
 Pangaldavan Island
 Pangititan Island
 Pass Island
 Patoyo Island
 Pingkitinan Island
 Popototan Island
 Rat Island
 Rhodes Island
 Salimbubuc Island
 Salung Island
 Salvacion Island
 Sangat Island
 Santa Monica Island
 South Cay Island
 Talampulan Island
 Talanpetan Island
 Tambon Island
 Tampel Island
 Tangat Island
 Tanoban Island
 Tantangon Island
 Tara Island
 Teardrop Island
 Titangcob Island
 Uson Island
 Vanguardia Island
 West Nalaut Island

Catanduanes

 Balacay Island
 Calabagio Island
 Jumbit Islets
 Lete Island
 Macalanhag Island
 Maguinling Island
 Tignob Island
 Panay Island
 Porongpong Island
 Pinohagan Island
 Pondanan Island
 Virac Island

Central Luzon

 Camara Island
 Capones Island
 Egg Islands
 Hermana Mayor Island
 Hermana Menor Island
 Los Frailes Islands
 Magalawa Island
 Matalvi Island
 Pamana (Pequeña) Island
 Potipot Island
 Salvador Island
 Silanguin Island
 Subic Chiquita Island
 Grande Island
 Tabones Island

Cuyo Archipelago

 Adunbrat Island
 Agutaya Island
 Alcisiras Island
 Bararin Island
 Bisucay Island
 Canipo Island
 Caponyan Island
 Cauayan Island
 Cocoro Island
 Cuyo Island
 Dit Island
 Guinlabo Island
 Halog Island
 Imalaguan Island
 Imaruan Island
 Indagamy Island
 Lean Island
 Lubid Island
 Malcatop Island
 Maligun Island
 Manamoc Island
 Mandit Island
 Maracañao Island
 Matarabis Island
 Oco Island
 Pamalican Island
 Pamitinan Island
 Pandan Island
 Pangatatan Island
 Patungal Island
 Paya Island
 Payo Island
 Putic Island
 Quiniluban Island
 Quinimatin Island
 Quinimatin Chico Islands
 Round Island
 Silad Island
 Silat Island
 Siparay Island
 Tacbubuc Island
 Tagauayan Island
 Tatay Island
 Tinituan Island

Ilocos Region

 Alo Island	
 Badoc Island
 Balaqui Island
 Cabalitian Island
 Cabarruyan Island
 Cangaluyan Island
 Comas Island
 Culebra Island
 Dos Hermanos Islands
 Hundred Islands
 Lagtaras Island
 Monroe Island
 Narra Island
 Pinget Island
 Poro Island
 Salomague Island
 Santiago Island
 Siapar Island
 Silaqui Island
 Tagaporo Island
 Tambac Island
 Tanduyong Island

Manila Bay Islands

 Binuangan Island
 Caballo Island
 Carabao Island
 Corregidor Island
 El Fraile Island
 La Monja Island
 Los Cochinos Islands
 Tubutubu Island

Marinduque

 Banot Island
 Elefante Island
 Hakupan Island
 Maniuaya Island
 Marinduque Island
 Mompog Island
 Salomaque Island
 San Andres Island
 Santa Cruz Island
 Tres Reyes Islands
 Baltazar Island
 Gaspar Island
 Melchor Island

Masbate

 Arena Island
 Bagababoy Island
 Bagumbanua Island
 Balanguingue Island
 Bugtung Island
 Burias Island
 Busing Island
 Cagpating Island
 Camasusu Island
 Carogo Island
 Chico Island
 Daquit-Daquit Island
 Deagan Island
 Guilutugan Island
 Guinauayan Island
 Guinlabagan Island
 Guinluthagan Island
 Hamoraon Island
 Jintotolo Island
 Magcaraguet Island
 Majaba Island
 Manoc Island
 Masbate Island
 Matabao Island
 Naboctot Island
 Nabugtu Island
 Nagarao Island
 Nagurang Island
 Namatian Island
 Napayauan Island
 Naro Island
 Paltaban Island
 Peña Island
 Pobre Island
 Puting Island
 Sablayan Island
 San Miguel Island (Masbate)
 Sombreno Island
 Tanguingui Island
 Templo Island
 Ticao Island
 Tinalisayan Islets
 Tumalaytay Island
 Veagan Island

Metro Manila

 Isla de Balut (Tondo)
 Isla de Convalecencia (San Miguel)
 Freedom Island (Parañaque) – man-made island
 Isla de Provisor (Paco)
 Isla Pulo (Navotas)
 Former islands
 Isla de Binondo
 Isla de Romero (Quiapo)
 Isla de Tanduay (San Miguel)
 Isla de Tanque (Paco)

Mindoro

 Ambil Island
 Ambulong Island
 Anaganahao Island
 Apo Island (Mindoro)
 Alibatan Island
 Aslom Island
 Baco Islands
 Baco Grande Island
 Baco Chico Island
 Binantgaan Island
 Boquete Island
 Buyayao Island
 Cabra Island
 Cayos del Bajo Island
 Garza Island
 Golo Island
 Ilin Island
 Libago Island
 Lubang Island
 Maasim Island
 Malavatuan Island
 Malaylay Island
 Manadi Island
 Mandaui Island
 Masin Island
 Medio Island (Mindoro)
 Menor Island (Mindoro)
 Mindoro Island
 North Pandan Island
 Opao Island
 Pambaron Island
 Paniguian Island
 Pocanol Island
 San Antonio Island
 Sibalat Island
 Silonay Island
 South Pandan Island
 Suguicay Island
 Tajud Island
 Talinas Island
 Tambaron Island
 White Island

Palawan

 Albaguen Island
 Albay Island
 Anas Island
 Apo Island
 Apulit Island
 Arena Island
 Arrecife Island (Bataraza)
 Arrecife Island (Honda Bay)
 Bagambangan Island
 Baja Hanura Island
 Balabac Island
 Bancalan Island
 Bancauan Island
 Bancoran Island
 Bangawan Island
 Bangiluan Island
 Barangonan Island
 Batas Island
 Bessie Island
 Bibangan Island
 Binatican Island
 Binga Island
 Bintaugan Island
 Binulbulan Island
 Bird's Island
 Bivouac Island
 Boayan Island
 Bongot Island
 Boombong Island
 Bowen Island
 Bucid Island
 Bugsuk Island
 Buquias Island
 Bush Island (Palawan)
 Butacan Island
 Byan Island
 Cabugan Islands
 Cabuli Island
 Cacbolo Island
 Cacbucao Island
 Cacnipa Island
 Cagayancillo Island
 Cagdanao Island
 Cagsalay Island
 Cakisigan Island
 Calabadian Island
 Calabatuan Island
 Calabucay Island
 Calabugdong Island
 Calalong Island
 Calampuan Island
 Calandagan Island
 Cambari Island
 Canabungan Island
 Candaraman Island
 Canimeran Island
 Cañon Island
 Capsalon Island
 Capyas Island
 Casian Island
 Casirahan Island
 Castle Island
 Catalat Island
 Cauayan Island
 Cavili Island
 Cayoya Island
 Central Island
 Comiran Island
 Coral Island
 Cotad Island
 Dadaliten Island
 Dalahican Island
 Damad Island
 Daracotan Island
 Datag Islands
 Debangan Island
 Denanayan Island
 Deribongan Island
 Dinif Island
 Dinisonan Island
 Ditadita Island
 Ditnot Island
 Dondonay Island
 Double Island
 Dry Island
 Dumaran Island
 East Guhuan Island
 Elephant Island
 Emelina Island
 Flower Island
 Fondeado Island
 Fraser Island
 Gabung Island
 Gardiner Island
 Green Island
 Guindabdaban Island
 Hen and Chickens Island
 Howley Island
 Ibalaton Island
 Ibohor Island
 Ibulbol Island
 Icadambanauan Island
 Iloc Island
 Imorigue Island
 Imuruan Island
 Inamukan Island
 Inobian Island
 Inoladoan Island
 Johnson Island
 Josefa Island
 Kalayaan Islands or Spratly Islands (claimed by China, Taiwan, Malaysia, Brunei and Vietnam)
 Bailan Island
 Binago Island
 Kota Island
 Lagos Island
 Lawak Island
 Ligao Island
 Likas Island
 Pag-asa Island
 Panata Island
 Parola Island
 Patag Island
 Pugad Island
 Rurok Island
 Kalungpang Island
 Kaoya Island
 Lampiligan Island
 Langisan Island
 Langoy Island
 Liabdan Island
 Linda Island
 Little Maosanon Island
 Lomalayang Island
 Luli Island
 Lumbucan Island
 Lump Island
 Maalaquequen Island
 Macuao Island
 Maducang Island
 Makesi Island
 Malaibo Island
 Malanao Island
 Malapackun Island
 Malapnia Island
 Malauton Island
 Malcorot Island
 Malinsono Island
 Malotamban Island
 Mangsee Island
 Mantangule Island
 Manuc Manucan Island
 Manucan Island
 Manulali Island
 Maobanen Island
 Maosanon Island
 Maqueriben Island
 Marantao Island
 Maraquit Island
 Maricaban Island
 Mariquit Island
 Maroday Island
 Mayabacan Island
 Mayakli Island
 Maybara Island
 Maylakan Island
 Maytiguid Island
 Meara Island
 Mialbok Island
 Nabat Island
 Nagulon Island
 Nasalet Island
 Nasubata Island
 Niaporay Island
 Nokoda Island
 North Channel Island
 North Islet (Tubbataha Reef)
 North Mangsee Island
 North Verde Island
 Notch Island
 Pabellon Islands
 Palawan Island
 Palm Island
 Paly Island
 Pamalatan Island
 Pandan Island
 Pandanan Island
 Pangisian Island
 Papagapa Island
 Parunponon Island
 Passage Island
 Patawan Island
 Patetan Island
 Patongong Island
 Peaked Island
 Pez Island
 Pirate Island
 Puerco Island
 Pulaw Talam Island
 Puntog Islands
 Quimbaludan Island
 Ramesamey Island
 Ramos Island
 Rangod Island
 Rasa Island
 Reinard Island
 Rinambacan Island
 Rita Island
 Rizal Pongtog Island
 Roughton Island
 Salingsingan Island
 San Miguel Islands
 Sanz Island
 Secam Island
 Segyam Islands
 Señorita Island
 Shell Island
 Silanga Islands
 Simizu Island
 Small Pagbo Island
 Sombrero Island
 South Island
 South Islet (Tubbataha Reef)
 South Mangsee Island
 South Verde Island
 Stanlake Island
 Suotiv Island
 Tagalinong Island
 Tagbulo Island
 Talacanen Island
 Tanusa Island
 Tarusan Islands
 Temple Island
 Tidepole Island
 Tomandang Island
 Tres Marias Islands
 Triple Cima Island
 Tubbataha Reef
 Tuluran Island
 Ursula Island
 Wedge Island
 White Island
 White Round Island

Polillo Islands

 Anawan Island
 Anirong Island
 Balesin Island
 Buguitay Island
 Cabaloa Island
 Diligin Island
 East Ikikon Island
 Icol Island
 Ikikon Island
 Jomalig Island
 Kalongkooan Island
 Kalotkot Island
 Karlagan Island
 Katabunan Island
 Katakian Chica Island
 Katakian Grande Island
 Lantao Island
 Lumaya Island
 Malaguinoan Island
 Minamata Island
 Palasan Island
 Pandanan Island
 Patnanungan Island
 Pinaglonglogan Island
 Polillo Island
 San Rafael Island
 Uala Islands
 Usok Island

Romblon

 Agdapdap Islet
 Aguada Islet
 Alad Island
 Alfonso XIII (Molo) Island
 Aregita Islets
 Baboy-baboy Islets
 Bang-og Island
 Banton Island
 Bantoncillo Island
 Batacan Islet
 Biaringan Island
 Binucot Islet
 Cabahan Island
 Cabugaan Islets
 Carabao Island
 Carlota Island
 Cascaro Islets
 Cobrador Island
 Cresta de Gallo Island
 Gakot Island
 Guimpasilan Island
 Guindauahan ni Bendoy Island
 Guinhoan Islet
 Hinaguman Islet
 Inanayan Islet
 Isabel Island
 Lapus-lapus Islet
 Lictinon Island
 Loboton Islet
 Logbon Island
 Maestro de Campo (Sibale) Island
 Manamoc (Japar) Island
 Nabagbagan Islets
 Nilintian Islet
 Origon Islets
 Otod Islet
 Paksi Islet
 Pez Islet
 Polloc Island
 Prat Islets
 Puro Islet
 Ramiligan Island
 Romblon Island
 Sibuyan Island
 San Pedro Island
 Simara Island
 Tablas Island
Tinang Islets
 Tinigban Islet
 Uyangon Islet

Southern Tagalog

 Alabat Island
 Alibijaban Island
 Anilon Island
 Apat Island
 Bakaw-Bakaw Island
 Balot Island
 Baluti Island
 Binombonan Island
 Bird Island
 Bonga Island
 Bonito Island
 Bubuin Island
 Burunggoy Island
 Caban Island
 Cagbalete Island
 Calamba Island
 Culebra Island
 Dalig Island
 Dampalitan Island
 Fortune Island
 Ikulong Island
 Isla Puting Bato Island
 Lagdauin Island
 Lambauing Island
 Ligpo Island
 Limbones Island
 Malahi Island
 Malajibomanoc Island
 Mangayao Island
 Manlanat Island
 Maricaban Island
 Napayong Island
 Pagbilao Chica Island
 Pagbilao Grande Island
 Palasan Island
 Patayan Island
 Santa Amalia Island
 Sombrero Island
 Talabaan Islands
 Talim Island
 Tingloy Island
 Twin Island
 Verde Island
 Volcano Island

Mindanao

Caraga

 Agony Island (Surigao del Sur)
 Aling Island
 Amaga Island
 Arangasa Islands
 Ayninan Island
 Ayoki Island
 Bagasinan Island
 Banga Island
 Bayagnan Island
 Britania Island
 Cabgan Island (Surigao del Sur)
 Condona Island
 Gabao Islet
 General Island (Surigao del Norte)
 Hamuan Island
 Haycock Islands
 Hinatuan Island
 Jobo Island
 Kabo Island
 Lamagon Island
 Lapinigan Island
 Lenungao Islands
 Load Island
 Ludguran Island
 Maanoc Island
 Mahaba Island (Surigao del Norte)
 Mahaba Island (Surigao del Sur)
 Majangit Island
 Mancahoram Island
 Mancangangi Island
 Maopia Island
 Maowa Island
 Masapelid Island
 Mawes Island
 Nagubat Island
 Panirongan Island
 Puyo Island
 Singag Island
 Sugbu Island
 Taganongan Island
 Talavera Island
 Tigdos Island
 Tinago Island (Surigao del Norte)
 Unamao Island

Central Mindanao

 Alidama Island
 Balot Island
 Balutmato Island
 Bongo Island
 Donayang Island
 East Balut Island
 Ibus Island
 Limbayan Island
 Sarampungan Island
 Tagatungan Island
 Taytayan Island
 West Balut Island
 Balaysan Island

Davao Region

 Balut Island
 Big Cruz Island
 Buenavista Island
 Bugoso Island
 Cabugao Island
 Dumalag Island
 Ivy Island
 Kopia Island
 Little Cruz Island
 Luban Island
 Malipano Island
 Manamil Island
 Mangrove Island
 Oak Island
 Olanivan Island
 Pandasan Island
 Pujada Island
 Quinablongan Island
 Samal Island
 San Victor Island
 Sarangani Island
 Sigaboy Island
 Talicud Island
 Uanivan Island

Dinagat Islands

 Awasan Island
 Capiquian Island
 Danaon Island
 Dinagat Island
 Doot Island
 East Caliban Island
 Hagaknab Island
 Hanigad Island
 Hibuson Island
 Hikdop Island
 Kanhanusa Island
 Kanihaan Island
 Kayabangan Island
 Kayosa Island
 Kotkot Island
 Little Hibuson Island
 Nonoc Island
 Pangabangan Island
 Puyo Island (Dinagat)
 Rasa Island
 Sayao Island
 Sibale Island (Dinagat)
 Sibanac Island
 Sibanoc Island
 Sumilon Island (Dinagat)
 Tabuk Island
 Unib Island
 West Caliban Island

Northern Mindanao

 Agutayan Island
 Bao-Baon Islands
 Cabgan Island
 Camiguin Island
 Capayas Island
 Dolphin Island
 Maburos Island
 Mantigue Island
 Naputhaw Island
 Silanga Island
 White Island

Siargao

 Abanay Island
 Anahawan Island
 Antokon Island
 Bancuyo Island
 Bucas Grande Island
 Cambiling Island
 Casalian Island
 Cawhagan Island
 Corregidor Island
 Daku Island
 East Bucas Island
 Guyam Island
 Halian Island
 Kangbangio Island
 Kangnun Island
 Kaob Island
 Lajanosa Island
 Laonan Island
 Mamon Island
 Megancub Island
 Middle Bucas Island
 Pagbasoyan Island
 Pansukian Island
 Poneas Island
 Siargao Island
 Tona Island

Sulu Archipelago

 Andulinang Island
 Babuan Island
 Baguan Island
 Balanguingui
 Baliungan Island
 Balukbaluk Island
 Bambanan Island
 Banaran Island
 Bangalao Island
 Bankungan Island
 Basbas Island
 Basibuli Islands
 Basilan Island
 Batalinos Islands
 Baturapac Island
 Bauang Diki Island
 Bihintinusa Island
 Bilangan Island
 Bilatan Island
 Bintoulan Island
 Bintut Island
 Bitinan Island
 Boaan Island
 Bohan Island
 Bongao Island
 Buan Island
 Bubuan Island
 Bucutua Island
 Bulan Island
 Buli Nusa Islet
 Buliculul Island
 Bulicutin Island
 Bulisuan Island
 Buluan Island
 Bulubulu Islet
 Bunabunaan Island
 Bungbunan Island
 Bunotpasil Island
 Cabingaan Island
 Cabucan Island
 Cacatan Island
 Cagayan de Sulu Island
 Calaitan Islets
 Calupag Island
 Camabalan Island
 Canas Island
 Cancuman Island
 Cap Island
 Capual Island
 Celandat Islets
 Coco Island
 Cujangan Island
 Cunilan Island
 Dakule Island
 Dalauan
 Dammai Island
 Dasaan Islands
 Dasalan Island
 Datubato Islands
 Dawata Island
 Dawildawil Island
 Deatobato Island
 Dipolod Island
 Doc Can Island
 Dongdong Island
 Dundangon Island
 East Bolod Island
 Gaiya Island
 Gal-loman Island
 Gondra Island
 Goreno Island
 Great Bakungaan Island
 Great Gounan Island
 Guimba Island
 Gujangan Island
 Haluluko Island
 Hegad Island
 Hole Island
 Jinhling Island
 Jolo Island
 Kabancauan Island
 Kaludlud Island
 Kaluitan Island
 Kamawi Island
 Kang Tipayan Dakula Island
 Kang Tipayan Diki Island
 Kauluan Island
 Kinapusan Island
 Kulassein Island
 Laa Island
 Lahangon Island
 Lahatlahat Island
 Lahatlahat Islands
 Lakit Island
 Laminusa Island
 Lampinigan Island
 Langaan Island
 Langas Island
 Lanhil Island
 Lapac Island
 Laparan Island
 Latuan Island
 Lawayan Island
 Lemondo Island
 Liaburan Island
 Lihiman Island
 Linawan Island
 Little Coco Island
 Little Dipolod Island
 Loran Island
 Lubucan Island
 Lugus Island
 Lumbian Island
 Lupa Island
 Magados Island
 Magpeos Island
 Malamawi Island
 Malicut Island
 Mamad Island
 Mamanak Island
 Mamanoc Island
 Mamanuc Island
 Mambahenauhan Island
 Manangal Island
 Manate Island
 Mandah Island
 Maniacolat Island
 Mantabuan Island
 Manubul Island
 Manuk Manka Island
 Manungut Island
 Maranas Island
 Marungas Island
 Mataja Island
 Minis Island
 Muligi Islands
 Nancan Island
 North Ubian Island
 Nusa Buani Island
 Nusa Islands
 Omapoy Island
 Orell Island
 Pahumaan Island
 Palajangan Island
 Pamelican Island
 Pamisaan Island
 Panampangan Island
 Pandak Island
 Pandalan Island
 Pandanan Island
 Pandami Island
 Pandugas Island
 Pangana Paturuan Island
 Panganap Island
 Pangas Island
 Pangasahan Island
 Pangasinan Island
 Pangutaran Islet
 Pantocunan Island
 Papahag Island
 Paquia Island
 Parangan Island
 Paral Island
 Pasigpasilan Island
 Pata Island
 Patian Island
 Perangan Island
 Pilas Island
 Pintado Island
 Pulau Billean Island
 Pulau Lankayan Island
 Punungan Islet
 Salaro Island
 Saluag Island
 Salkulakit Island
 Saluping Island
 Sanga-Sanga Island
 Sangasiapu Island
 Sangboy Islands
 Sarucsarucan Island
 Sasa Island
 Secubun Island
 Siasi Island
 Sibago Island
 Sibakel Island
 Sibijindacula Island
 Sibutu Island
 Sicagot Island
 Sicalangcalong Island
 Sicolan Islet
 Silumisan Island
 Siluag Island
 Simanayo Island
 Simbay Island
 Simisa Island
 Simunul Island
 Singaan Island
 Sipangkot Island
 Sipayu Island
 Sipungot Island
 Siringo Island
 Sirun Island
 Sitangkai Island
 Situgal Hea Island
 South Ubian Island
 Sucoligao Island
 Sugbai Island
 Suka Suka Dakula Islet
 Sulade Island
 Sumbasumba Island
 Suucan Island
 Taala Island
 Tabawan Island
 Tabolongan Island
 Tabuan Islands
 Taganak Island
 Tagao Island
 Tagutu Island
 Taitagan Island
 Taja Island
 Takela Island
 Takipamasilaan Island
 Talonpisa Island
 Taluc Island
 Talungan Island
 Tambilunay Island
 Tambulian Island
 Tamuk Island
 Tancan Island
 Tancolaluan Island
 Tandubas Island
 Tandubatu Island
 Tandungan Island
 Tanduowak Island
 Tapaan Island
 Tapiantana Island
 Tapul Island
 Tara Island
 Tataan Islands
 Tatalan Island
 Tatik Island
 Tauitaui Island
 Tawitawi Island
 Teinga Island
 Tengolan Island
 Teomabal Island
 Ticul Island
 Tiguilabun Island
 Tihik Tihik Island
 Tijitiji Islands
 Tinundukan Island
 Tinutungan Island
 Tongquil Island
 Tonkian Islands
 Tubalubac Island
 Tubigan Island
 Tulayan Island
 Tulian Island
 Tumbagaan Island
 Tumindao Island
 Tunbaunan Island
 Tungbukan Island
 Turtle Islands
 Tusan Bongao Island
 Tutu Kipa Island
 Ultra Island
 Usada Island
 West Bolod Island
 Zau Island

Zamboanga Peninsula

 Aliguay Island
 Bagiyas Island
 Balabac Island
 Bangaan Island
 Baong Island
 Bayangan Island
 Bibaya Island
 Bobo Island
 Buguias Island
 Buloan Island
 Caboc Island
 Cabog Island
 Cabut Island
 Cambugan Island
 Condulingan Island
 Dao-Dao Islands
 Gatusan Island
 Great Santa Cruz Island
 Igat Island
 Kabungan Island
 Lambang Island
 Lampinigan Island
 Lamuyong Island
 Lapinigan Islands
 Latas Island
 Letayon Island
 Lipari Island
 Little Malanipa Island
 Little Santa Cruz Island
 Lungui Island
 Lutangan Island
 Maculay Island
 Malanipa Island
 Murcielagos Island
 Nipa Nipa Islands
 Olutanga Island
 Pandalusan Island
 Panikian Island
 Paraitan Island
 Pina Island
 Pinya Island
 Piñahun Island
 Pisan Island
 Pitas Island
 Puli Puli Island
 Putili Island
 Sacol Island
 Sagayaran Island
 Salangan Island
 Selinog Island
 Sibulan Islands
 Simoadang Island
 Sirumon Island
 Ticala Islands
 Tictauan Island
 Tigabon Island
 Tigbauan Island
 Tigburacao Island
 Triton Island - Zamboanga
 Tugsocan Island
 Tumalutab Island
 Visa Island
 Vitali Island

Visayas

Biliran

 Calutan Island
 Capiñahan Island
 Caygan Island
 Dalutan Island
 Ginuroan Island
 Higatangan Island
 Maripipi Island
 Sambawan Island
 Tagampol Islet
 Tingkasan Islet

Bohol

 Bagongbanwa Island
 Balicasag Island
 Banacon Island
 Banbanon Island
 Bansalan Island
 Bantigue Island
 Batasan Island
 Bilangbilangan Island
 Bonoon Island
 Budlaan Island
 Butan Island
 Bugatusan Island
 Cabantulan Island
 Cabgan Island (Bohol)
 Cabilao Island
 Cabul-an Big Island
 Cabul-an Small Island
 Cabasihan Small Island
 Calituban Island
 Calanggaman Island
 Cancostino Island
 Cataban Island
 Catang Island
 Catiil Island
 Cauayan Island
 Cuaming Island
 Cuaming II Island
 Del Mar Island
 Gak-ang Island
 Gaus Island
 Guindacpan Island
 Handayan Island
 Hambongan Big Island
 Hayaan Island
 Hingotanan Island
 Inanoran Island
 Jao Island
 Juagdan Island
 Lapinig Island
 Lapinig Chico Island
 Lumayag Island
 Lumislis Island
 Ma-agpit Island
 Mahaba Island
 Mahanay Island
 Malingin Island
 Mantatao Island
 Maumauan Island
 Mocaboc Island
 Nasingin Island
 Nocnocan Island
 Pandanon Island
 Pamasalon Island
 Pamasaun Island
 Pamilacan Island
 Panga Island
 Pangangan Island
 Pangapasan Island
 Panglao Island
 Puntod Island
 Puntod Guindacpan Island
 Saae Island
 Sag Island
 Sagasa Island
 Sandingan Island
 Sib Island
 Silo Island
 Tabangdio Island
 Tabaon Island
 Tambu Island
 Tangaon Island
 Tilmubo Island
 Tintiman Island
 Tres Reyes Island
 Ubay Island
 Villalimpia Island
 Virgin Island

Cebu

 Bantayan Island
 Biyagayag Islands (Daku and Diot)
 Botique Island (or Botigues, Batquis)
 Botong Island
 Doong Island
 Hilutungan Island (or Hilotongan, Lutungan)
 Hilantagaan Island (or Jicantangan, Cabalauan)
 Lipayran Island
 Moambuc Island (or Maamboc, Moamboc, Kangka Abong, Cangcabong)
 Mambacayao Island (or Mambacayao Daku)
 Mambacayao Gamay Island
 Panitugan Island (or Banitugan)
 Patao Island (or Polopolo)
 Panangatang Island (or Pintagan)
 Sagasay Islands (or Sagasa, Tagasa)
 Silagon Island
 Hilantagaan Diot (or Silion, Pulo Diyot (little island))
 Yao Islet (or Mambacayao Diot)
 Calamangan Island
 Camotes Islands
 Pacijan Island
 Ponson Island
 Poro Island
 Tulang Island
 Capitancillo Island
 Carnaza Island
 Chocolate Island (Cebu)
 Dakit-Dakit Island
 Gapas-Gapas Island
 Gato Island
 Guintacan Island
 Jibitnil Island
 Mactan Island
 Malapascua Island
 Maria Island (Cebu)
 Olango Island
 Camungi Island
 Caohagan Island
 Caubian Daku Island
 Caubian Gamay Island
 Gilutongan Island
 Nalusuan Island
 Pangan-an Island
 Sulpa Island
 Pescador Island
 Sumilon Island
 Zaragoza Island

Former islands
 Cauit Island

Guimaras

 Ave Maria Island
 Guiuanon Island
 Inampulugan Island
 Malingin Island
 Nabural Island
 Naburot Island
 Nadulao Island
 Nagarao Island
 Nalibas Island
 Natunga Island
 Nauai Island
 Panubulon Island
 Seraray Island
 Taklong Island
 Tandog Island
 Unisan Island
 Yeto Island

Leyte

 Bacol Island
 Badian Island
 Cabgan Island (Leyte)
 Calaguan Island
 Kalanggaman Island
 Caltagan Island
 Calumpijan Island
 Canigao Island
 Cuatro Islas
 Apid Island
 Digyo Island
 Himokilan Island
 Mahaba Island
 Cumaiac Island
 Dabun Island
 Danajon Islet
 Gatighan Island
 Gigatangan Island
 Gumalac Island
 Limasawa Island
 Nabubuy Island
 Panaon Island
 San Pablo Island (Leyte)
 San Pedro Island (Leyte)
 Taboc Island
 Zapatos Island

Negros Island

 Agutayan Island
 Anajauan Island
 Apo Island
 Bulata Island
 Danjugan Island
 Diutay Island
 Jomabo Island
 Lakawon Island
 Molocaboc Island
 Sipaway (Refugio) Island
 Siquijor Island
 Suyaan Island
 Talabong Island

Panay

 Adcalayo Island
 Balbagon Island
 Batbatan Island
 Bayas Islets
 Bayas Island
 Manipulon Islet
 Magosipal Islet
 Pangalan Islet
 Binuluangan Island
 Bogtongan Islands
 Boracay Island
 Buri Island
 Calabazas Island
 Calagnaan Island
 Caluya Island
 Canas Island
 Chinela Island
 Concepcion Islands
 Agho Island
 Anauayan Island
 Bag-o Abo Island
 Bag-o Isi Island
 Baliguian Island
 Bocot Island
 Botlog Island
 Bulubadiangan Island
 Chico Island
 Colebra Island
 Danao-Danao Island
 Igbon Island
 Malangabang Island
 Pan de Azucar Island
 Sombrero Island
 Tago Island
 Tagubanhan Island
 Crocodile Island
 Dunao Island
 Gigantes Islands
 Antonia Island
 Bantigui Island
 Bulubadiang Islet
 Cabugao Island
 Gigantes Norte
 Gigantes Sur
 Gigantillo Islet
 Gigantuna Islet
 Tanguingui Island
 Turnina Islet
 Himamylan Island
 Juraojurao Island
 Lacdian Island
 Laurel Island
 Libagao Island
 Loguingot Island
 Mabay Island
 Magaisi Island
 Magalumbi Island
 Maliaya Island
 Manigonigo Island
 Maniguin Island
 Manlot Island
 Mararison Island
 Marbuena Island
 Matagda Island
 Nagarao Island
 Naburot Island
 Nagubat Island
 Nasidman Island
 Natig Island
 Nilidlaran Island
 Nogas Island
 Ojastras Island
 Olotayan Island
 Panagatan Malaqui Island
 Pandan Island
 Pinamucan Island
 Pulo Piña Island
 Salog Island
 Semirara Island
 Sibalon Island
 Sibato Island
 Sibay Island
 Sibolon Island
 Sicogon Island
 Seco Island
 Tabon Island
 Tabugon Island
 Tabugon Chico Islet
 Tinguiban Islet
 Tulunanaun Island
 Tumaguin Island
 Zapato Island
 Zapato Menor Island

Samar

 Aguada Island
 Almagro Island
 Anahao Island
 Anajao Island
 Andis Island
 Aocon Island
 Apiton Island
 Badian Island
 Balinatio Island
 Bangon Island
 Bani Island
 Bar Islet (Samar)
 Bascal Island
 Bascal-Agotay Island
 Basiao Island
 Batag Island
 Batgongon Island
 Baul Island
 Binaliw Islet
 Binay Island
 Biri Island
 Boloan Island
 Botig Island
 Buad Island
 Buri Island
 Cabaongon Island
 Cagduyong Island
 Cahayagan Island
 Calapan Island
 Calicoan Island
 Camandag Island
 Cambaye Island
 Canahauan Dacu Island
 Canahauan Guti Island
 Candule Island
 Caparangasan Island
 Capogpocanan Island
 Capul Island
 Catalaban Island
 Cauhagan Island
 Coconut Island
 Dabong Island
 Dalupiri Island
 Danaodanauan Island
 Darahuay Islands
 Daram Island
 Darsena Island
 Divinubo Island
 Escarpada Island
 Fulin Island
 Goyam Island
 Guimtim Island
 Guintarcan Island
 Hilabaan Island
 Hirapsan Island
 Hiuinatungan Island
 Homangad Island
 Homonhon Island
 Inatunglan Island
 Iniyao Island
 Jinamoc Island
 Kantican Island
 Kapuroan Islets
 Karikiki Island
 Kaybani Island
 Laguinit Island
 Lalawigan Island
 Lamingao Island
 Leleboon Island
 Libucan Island
 Libucan Gutiay Island
 Linao Island
 Little Karikiki Island
 Macalayo Island
 Macarite Island
 Macton Island
 Magesang Island
 Makate Island
 Malatugawi Island
 Manicani Island
 Marapilit Island
 Maravilla Island (Samar)
 Masigni Island
 Medio Island
 Minanut Island
 Minasangan Island
 Montoconan Island
 Monbon Island
 Napalisan Island
 Naranjo Islands
 Destacado Island
 Majaba Island
 Maragat Island
 Panganoron Island
 Sila Island
 Sangputan Island
 Tarnate Island
 Palihon Island
 Pamuloton Island (Tabunan)
 Parasan Island
 Pasig Island
 Pilar Island
 Poro Island
 Porogot Daco Island
 Punubulu Island
 Rosa Island
 Samar Island
 San Andres Island
 San Bernardino Island
 San Juan Island
 Santa Rita Island
 Santo Niño Island
 Sibay Island
 Sibugay Island (Samar)
 Sisi Island
 Sulangan Island
 Suluan Island
 Tagapul-an Island
 Tagdaranao Islands
 Tangad Island
 Tadtad Island
 Timpasan Island
 Tinau Island
 Tubabao Island
 Uacuac Islands
 Uguis Island
 Victory Island

Map

See also

 List of islands
 List of island cities and municipalities in the Philippines
 List of islands in the Greater Manila Area
 Island groups of the Philippines

References

Archipelagoes of the Philippines
Philippines

Islands